Praveen Nischol is a producer, director and writer. He has made Feature Films, T.V. Serials and T.V. Commercials. He is the younger brother of Actor Navin Nischol.

Early life and education 

Praveen Nischol was born in Delhi and had his early education in Park English School in Calcutta, wherein Class 8 he was awarded the gold medal for the most outstanding student of the year. From his early years, he was very active on stage in acting and debates in which he won many awards. After class 8 he shifted to Delhi and finished his schooling at Delhi Public School, Mathura Rd., where he got many awards in debates and was also awarded the best actor award, on the school's annual day function, by the then President of India Dr. Zakir Hussain.

He did his graduation in BSc from St. Stephen's College in Delhi University. He then joined M.A. in philosophy in Hindu College (Delhi University), but left it halfway and came to Mumbai to work in films and join his brother Navin Nischol, who was then playing the lead man in his first Bollywood Movie, "Sawan Bhadon".

Career 

Praveen started his career as a Chief Assistant Director to Mohan Sehgal in the film "Woh Main Nahin’  which again starred the "Sawan Bhadon’ pair Navin Nischol and Rekha. He also helped Mohan Sehgal in Production and for many years was the Business Agent for his brother Navin.

He started his career as a Director in a film "Jaan Se Pyara" starring Navin, Rekha, Reena Roy, Amjad Khan, Prem Chopra etc., with music by R.D.Burman. The movie started with the recording of two Songs sung by Asha Bhonsle. It was on the lines of an International James Bond with Indian emotions. The most expensive film of its time. The Special effects of this movie were to be done by John Dykstra of Apogee Studios, Los Angeles, who had made the epic film "Star Wars" in partnership with George Lucas. There were many discussions for the same. Praveen had shot seven reels of the film but then unfortunately the movie was abandoned by the Producer as he ran into financial difficulties. These were of a nature which unfortunately did not allow the film to be taken over by any other Production house either. 

After this initial setback, Praveen took the rights of the four volumes of the Bengali literary Classic "Shrikant", by Sarat Chandra Chatterji. He made the first two volumes in a sponsored T.V. Serial for Doordarshan, called "Shrikant", starring Farooque Shaikh, Sujata Mehta, Priyadarshani, Bharat Bhushan etc.  It was written by Ali Raza, had music by Jaidev and was Produced jointly with Manmohan Shetty and Pradeep Uppoor. The Serial was of 18 Episodes of half-hour each and was the first Serial to be shot entirely on film. It went on to be a big success and got huge critical acclaim. This was the first Asian Serial ever to feature on Channels 1 and 2 of BBC.

Using some portions of the above Serial, Praveen shot some more and made a feature film "Rajlaxmi". This was sold to Mr. F.C. Mehra, mainly for foreign markets.

After the success of the Serial, Doordarshan then invited Praveen to do the third Volume of the Classic Novel, and then Commissioned him to make ‘Shrikant II’ in 24 Episodes of half-hour each. Farooque Shaikh again played the role of Shrikant and joining him in the cast were Irfan Khan, Mrinal Kulkarni, Ravinder Mankani, A.K. Hangal etc.

Praveen then went on to Produce and Direct a Feature film "English Babu Desi Mem", starring Shah Rukh Khan, Sonali Bendre, Saeed Jaffery etc. 

He Produced, Wrote and Directed a TV Film "Jahan Pyar Miley" of 90 mins. duration, for the programme ‘Director's Cut’ on Channel 9.

In 2002 he joined Manmohan Shetty’s Company, Adlabs, and started a Film Production Division named Entertainment One. The Company funded and Co Produced about 20 Feature Films.

The first film to release from the Company was Gangajal in 2003, in which Praveen shared the Producer's National Award with Prakash Jha.

In 2007 Praveen left Adlabs (which had become Reliance Adlabs), and became a Partner with Ram Gopal Varma. Together they Produced three films. The first was ‘Sarkar Raj’ starring Amitabh Bachchan, Abhishek Bachchan and Aishwarya Rai, followed by ‘Contract’ and ‘Phoonk’. They separated in 2009, after which Praveen started an Ad Film Company ‘White Onion Films’ with two Partners, E. Niwas and Ryan Suares and Produced many T.V. Commercials.

Praveen is also Producing a Feature Film. The Script of the film has been written by him. Praveen also has a Line Production Company which does Line Production, Cost Reporting and Accounting for Feature Films, T.V. Commercials, Photo Shoots etc.

Filmography

Feature Films

TV serials

References 

Living people
Film producers from Delhi
Indian writers
St. Stephen's College, Delhi alumni
Year of birth missing (living people)